Marshal Baghramyan Avenue is an avenue in the central Kentron and the northwestern Arabkir districts of Yerevan, Armenia. The avenue is named after the Soviet Armenian commander and Marshal of the Soviet Union Hovhannes Baghramyan whose statue stands at the central part of the avenue. It was known as the Friendship Avenue (Comradeship Avenue) between 1970 and 1995, as a tribute to the friendship of all Soviet Union member nations.

The  avenue starts with the Place de France at the east and ends up with the Barekamutyun Square at the west. It is mainly home to educational, government and foreign diplomatic mission buildings.

Notable buildings
Marshal Baghramyan Avenue is home to a series of notable buildings and structures.

Government buildings

 The Prime Minister's Residence (commonly known as Baghramyan 26)
 The National Assembly of Armenia
 The National Security Council of Armenia
 The Constitutional Court of Armenia

Foreign diplomatic missions
 Embassy of the United Kingdom
 Embassy of the Sweden
 Embassy of the Syrian Arab Republic
 Embassy of the People's Republic of China
 The consulate of Thailand

Education, science and culture

 Armenian National Academy of Sciences
 American University of Armenia
 House-Museum of Aram Khachaturian
 The Writers Union of Armenia
 The Architects' Union of Armenia
 The public schools of: Anton Chekhov (No. 55), Republic of Argentina (No. 76), Hayrapet Hayrapetyan (No. 78) and Hakob Oshakan (No. 172)

Other structures
 The Lovers' Park
Marshal Baghramyan underground station
Barekamutyun underground station
 The Armenian Evangelical Church

Gallery

References

Transport in Yerevan
Roads in Armenia
Streets in Yerevan